Lipase A, lysosomal acid type is a protein that in humans is encoded by the LIPA gene.

Function

This gene encodes lipase A, the lysosomal acid lipase (also known as cholesterol ester hydrolase). This enzyme functions in the lysosome to catalyze the hydrolysis of cholesteryl esters and triglycerides. 

Mutations in this gene can result in Wolman disease and cholesteryl ester storage disease. Alternatively spliced transcript variants have been found for this gene. [provided by RefSeq, Jan 2014].

References

Further reading